Same-sex marriage in Louisiana has been legal since the U.S. Supreme Court's ruling in Obergefell v. Hodges on June 26, 2015. The court held that the denial of marriage rights to same-sex couples is unconstitutional, invalidating Louisiana's ban on same-sex marriage. The ruling clarified conflicting court rulings on whether state officials are obligated to license same-sex marriages. Governor Bobby Jindal confirmed on June 28 that Louisiana would comply with the ruling once the Fifth Circuit Court of Appeals reversed its decision in a Louisiana case, which the Fifth Circuit did on July 1. Jindal then said the state would not comply with the ruling until the U.S. District Court for the Eastern District of Louisiana reversed its judgment, which it did on July 2. All parishes now issue marriage licenses in accordance with federal law.

Legal history

Domestic partnerships
In 1997, the city of New Orleans extended health insurance benefits to the same-sex partners of city employees, the first and only city in the state to do so. In 1999, the city created a domestic partner registry.

Legal restrictions
On September 18, 2004, by 78% to 22%, state voters approved a state constitutional amendment that banned same-sex marriages and civil unions. The measure banned any other legal status "identical or substantially similar to that of marriage".

In 1988 and 1999, the Louisiana State Legislature added provisions to the Civil Code that prohibited same-sex couples from marrying and prohibited the recognition of same-sex marriages from other jurisdictions. During this period, the United States Congress also enacted the federal Defense of Marriage Act.

Lawsuits

Costanza v. Caldwell

In July 2013, a state trial court dismissed a lawsuit, In Re Costanza and Brewer, brought by a lesbian couple who had married in California and sought to have their marriage recognized in order to allow Constanza to adopt Brewer's biological child. The plaintiffs appealed that dismissal because they were not allowed to amend their complaint, and on February 5, 2014, 15th Judicial District Court Judge Edward Rubin ruled in favor of the plaintiffs and authorized the adoption in a separate action.

Costanza and Brewer merged their suit that challenged Louisiana's same-sex marriage ban and their adoption case into one action. They were represented by private counsel, Lafayette attorney Joshua S. Guillory, and professor of law Paul Baier. On September 22, 2014, Judge Rubin found Louisiana's ban an unconstitutional violation of the Equal Protection, the Due Process and the Full Faith and Credit clauses of the U.S. Constitution. The ruling only affected the state's 15th Judicial District, comprising the parishes of Lafayette, Acadia and Vermilion. State officials asked Rubin to stay his decision and announced plans to appeal directly to the Louisiana Supreme Court. He ordered the state to allow the plaintiffs to file a joint state income tax return and to allow their adoption to proceed. He enjoined the state from enforcing laws that "prohibit a person from marrying a person of the same sex". He stayed his ruling pending appeal, and Attorney General Buddy Caldwell appealed directly to the Louisiana Supreme Court, which heard oral arguments as Costanza v. Caldwell on January 29, 2015.

On July 7, 2015, following the U.S. Supreme Court decision in Obergefell v. Hodges on June 26, 2015, the Louisiana Supreme Court, by a 6–1 ruling, found the case moot and dismissed the state's appeal, making the district court's ruling in Costanza v. Caldwell final and binding in Louisiana regarding same-sex marriage.

Robicheaux v. George
In July 2013, a lawsuit brought in the U.S. District Court for the Eastern District of Louisiana challenged the state's refusal to recognize same-sex marriages from other jurisdictions. The plaintiffs were a same-sex couple married in Iowa in September 2012, later joined by a second couple; the case was assigned to Judge Martin Feldman. The court dismissed the suit in November 2013 because it found that the only named defendant, Attorney General Caldwell, had taken no specific action with respect to the plaintiffs' marriages.

On February 5, 2014, the Robicheaux plaintiffs, now joined by two women married in Iowa in 2013 and two men denied a marriage license in New Orleans in January 2014, refiled their suit, naming as principal defendant the state Director of Health, along with the Secretary of Revenue, with the case now styled Robicheaux v. George. Forum For Equality, a Louisiana LGBT activist group, filed a separate suit on behalf of four couples on February 12, seeking recognition of same-sex marriages established in other jurisdictions. On March 18, Judge Feldman consolidated the two cases under the name Robicheaux v. Caldwell. Oral arguments on motions for summary judgment were held on June 25.

On September 3, Judge Feldman ruled for the defendants, writing that "Louisiana has a legitimate interest ... whether obsolete in the opinion of some, or not, in the opinion of others ... in linking children to an intact family formed by their two biological parents". He wrote that the idea of same-sex marriage was "nonexistent and even inconceivable until very recently". He described the issue as "a clash between convictions regarding the value of state decisions reached by way of the democratic process as contrasted with personal, genuine, and sincere lifestyle choices recognition." He found nothing in United States v. Windsor or previous Fifth Circuit decisions to require him to subject Louisiana's ban to "heightened scrutiny". He also ruled that "There is simply no fundamental right, historically or traditionally, to same-sex marriage." Under "rational basis review", he accepted the state's claim that its laws "serve a central state interest of linking children to an intact family formed by their biological parents" and further its interest in "safeguarding that fundamental social change ... is better cultivated through democratic consensus." He wrote:

He characterized other federal court decisions invalidating state bans on same-sex marriage as "the volley of nationally orchestrated court rulings ... [that] thus far exemplify a pageant of empathy; decisions impelled by a response of innate pathos." He also asked what the impact of a decision for the plaintiffs might foretell:

All parties asked the Fifth Circuit Court of Appeals to set an expedited briefing schedule to allow an appeal to be heard alongside a Texas case, De Leon v. Perry. The Fifth Circuit granted that request on September 25. The Fifth Circuit heard oral arguments on January 9, 2015, before Judges Patrick Higginbotham, Jerry Edwin Smith, and James E. Graves Jr. On November 20, the plaintiffs filed a petition asking the U.S. Supreme Court for a writ of certiorari before judgment, that is, to hear the case, now Robicheaux v. George, without waiting for a decision from the Fifth Circuit. The state supported that request on December 2. The Supreme Court denied that petition on January 12, 2015.

U.S. Supreme Court ruling
On June 26, 2015, following the decision of the U.S. Supreme Court in Obergefell v. Hodges, the plaintiffs asked the Fifth Circuit to immediately reverse the district court and have that court resolve the case in their favor. The same day, Attorney General Caldwell said that nothing in the Obergefell decision required the state to cease enforcing its same-sex marriage ban immediately. On June 28, Governor Bobby Jindal said the state would comply with the Supreme Court decision as soon as the Fifth Circuit reversed the district court ruling in Robicheaux that had upheld the state's ban. On July 1, the Fifth Circuit reversed the earlier ruling in Robicheaux and instructed the district court to record a judgment for the plaintiffs no later than July 17. Jindal then said the state would not recognize same-sex marriages until the district court reversed its ruling. In the district court, Judge Feldman issued a new judgment in favor of the plaintiffs on July 2.

Jindal was a vocal opponent of the court ruling. His initial reaction was to call for the disbanding of the Supreme Court, calling it "a public opinion poll instead of a judicial body". Jindal further stated, "This decision will pave the way for an all out assault against the religious freedom rights of Christians who disagree with this decision. This ruling must not be used as pretext by Washington to erode our right to religious liberty." Despite the United States being a secular state and the Establishment Clause forbidding governments from establishing or sponsoring religion, Jindal said that "[m]arriage between a man and a woman was established by God, and no earthly court can alter that." Attorney General Caldwell said he was "disappointed" with the decision and that it "[took] away a right that should have been left to the states".

Several parishes began issuing marriage licenses to same-sex couples on June 29, including Jefferson, Calcasieu, East Baton Rouge, West Feliciana, East Feliciana, Assumption, Livingston, Ascension and Tangipahoa. Celeste Autin and Alesia LeBoeuf were the first same-sex couple to marry in Louisiana in the early hours of Monday, June 29 in Jefferson Parish. A second couple, Michael Robinson and Earl Benjamin, were issued a marriage license in Gretna at around 11 a.m.. As of July 1, Orleans Parish refused to issue marriage licenses to same-sex couples. The district court ordered the state to begin licensing same-sex marriages in the parish the next day, and the state complied.
For sometime after the Obergefell ruling however, several parishes refused to issue marriage licenses to same-sex couples, including Jackson, LaSalle, Lincoln, Madison, Red River, St. Tammany and Webster. Those parishes began issuing licenses to all couples on July 6, 2015.

Developments after legalization
In March 2018, the Louisiana Senate Judiciary Committee rejected 1–4 a proposed bill to repeal the unconstitutional same-sex marriage ban in state statutes. Senator Jay Luneau, a Democrat from Alexandria, was the sole lawmaker in favor. The Louisiana Family Forum opposed the bill. Jean-Paul Morrell, a New Orleans Democrat and the bill's main sponsor, said, "This is the law of the land whether you like it or not." The Louisiana Law Institute also supported the bill.

Native American nations
Same-sex marriage is not legal on the reservation of the Chitimacha Tribe of Louisiana. Its Tribal Code states that "for a man and a woman to be married under this chapter each must: (1) be at least sixteen (16) years of age; (2) freely consent to the marriage; and (3) if under eighteen (18) years of age, obtain the consent of their custodial parents or legal guardians, if any." If the couple meets the requirements to marry, the Chitimacha Tribal Court in Charenton will issue a marriage license, and the couple may also choose to have a marriage ceremony, which may be performed by a judge of the Chitimacha Tribal Court, any public official whose duties include solemnizing marriages, or by an ordained or recognized minister, priest, or other leader of any religious faith. However, while same-sex marriages cannot be performed, it is likely that same-sex marriages performed outside the reservation, including in the state of Louisiana, are legally recognized. The Tribal Code states that "[a] marriage duly licensed and performed under the laws of the United States, any tribe, or foreign nation shall be recognized as valid by the Chitimacha Tribal Court for all purposes." Similarly, language guaranteeing recognition of marriage licenses from other jurisdictions is found in the Judicial Codes of the Coushatta Tribe of Louisiana: "A marriage which is valid under the laws of the State of Louisiana shall be recognized as valid for all purposes by the Coushatta Tribe."

It is unclear if same-sex marriage is recognized on the reservation of the Jena Band of Choctaw Indians. It is unknown if Choctaw two-spirit individuals were historically allowed to marry, as a lot of traditional knowledge was lost during the adoption of Christianity and the Trail of Tears for those Choctaw forcibly removed to the Indian Territory. Choctaw author LeAnne Howe stated in a 2022 book, "Often they weren't just involved with other men but had many levels of relationships. They were also involved with our community in very special ways. They could be healers. They're people that protected our children because they embodied more than one thing. And what is part of Choctawan aesthetics is that we revere things that are unusual. Different. When you look at the spirit that's connected in [ohoyo holba], and when they put on that dress in olden times, they are saying 'the embodiment of many'." Some female-bodied two-spirit individuals use the term . In the Houma language, the term is atak ubak. These modern terms usually tend to mean a gay, lesbian, or transgender person, though some two-spirit people do identify with these terms. The laws of the Tunica-Biloxi Indian Tribe are silent on who can marry.

Demographics and marriage statistics
Data from the 2000 U.S. census showed that 8,808 same-sex couples were living in Louisiana. By 2005, this had increased to 9,006 couples. Same-sex couples lived in all parishes of the state and constituted 1.0% of coupled households and 0.5% of all households in the state. Most couples lived in New Orleans, Jefferson and East Baton Rouge parishes, but the parishes with the highest percentage of same-sex couples were New Orleans (0.95% of all parish households) and Pointe Coupee (0.63%). Same-sex partners in Louisiana were on average younger than opposite-sex partners, more racially diverse, and more likely to be employed. However, the average and median household incomes of same-sex couples were lower than different-sex couples, and same-sex couples were also far less likely to own a home than opposite-sex partners. 25% of same-sex couples in Louisiana were raising children under the age of 18, with an estimated 4,157 children living in households headed by same-sex couples in 2005.

Public opinion
{| class="wikitable"
|+style="font-size:100%" | Public opinion for same-sex marriage in Louisiana
|-
! style="width:190px;"| Poll source
! style="width:200px;"| Date(s)administered
! class=small | Samplesize
! Margin oferror
! style="width:100px;"| % support
! style="width:100px;"| % opposition
! style="width:100px;"| % no opinion/don't know
|-
| Public Religion Research Institute
| align=center| March 8–November 9, 2021
| align=center| ?
| align=center| ?
|  align=center| 52%
| align=center| 46%
| align=center| 2%
|-
| Public Religion Research Institute
| align=center| January 7–December 20, 2020
| align=center| 549 random telephoneinterviewees
| align=center| ?
|  align=center| 62%
| align=center| 36%
| align=center| 2%
|-
| Public Religion Research Institute
| align=center| April 5–December 23, 2017
| align=center| 983 random telephoneinterviewees
| align=center| ?
|  align=center| 48%
| align=center| 44%
| align=center| 8%
|-
| Public Religion Research Institute
| align=center| May 18, 2016–January 10, 2017
| align=center| 1,410 random telephoneinterviewees
| align=center| ?
| align=center| 44%
|  align=center| 45%
| align=center| 11%
|-
| Public Religion Research Institute
| align=center| April 29, 2015–January 7, 2016
| align=center| 1,170 random telephoneinterviewees
| align=center| ?
| align=center| 41%
|  align=center| 49%
| align=center| 10%
|-
| New York Times/CBS News/YouGov
| align=center| September 20–October 1, 2014
| align=center| 2,187 likely voters
| align=center| ± 2.5%
| align=center| 39%
|  align=center| 46%
| align=center| 15%
|-
| Public Policy Polling
| align=center| June 26–29, 2014
| align=center| 664 registered voters
| align=center| ± 3.8%
| align=center| 32%
|  align=center| 55%
| align=center| 13%
|-
| Public Policy Research Lab
| align=center| February 4–February 24, 2014
| align=center| 1,095 respondents
| align=center| ± 3%
| align=center| 41.7%
|  align=center| 52.7%
| align=center| 5.6%
|-
| Public Policy Polling
| align=center| August 16–19, 2013
| align=center| 721 voters
| align=center| ± 3.7%
| align=center| 28%
|  align=center| 63%
| align=center| 10%
|-
| Harper Polling
| align=center| April 6–7, 2013
| align=center| 541 likely voters
| align=center| ± 4.21%
| align=center| 21%
|  align=center| 60%
| align=center| 19%
|-
| Public Policy Research Lab
| align=center| February 8–March 17, 2013
| align=center| 930 respondents
| align=center| ± 3.6%
| align=center| 39.3%
|  align=center| 56.3%
| align=center| 4.4%
|-
| Public Policy Polling
| align=center| February 8–12, 2013
| align=center| 603 voters
| align=center| ± 4%
| align=center| 29%
|  align=center| 59%
| align=center| 12%
|-

See also
 LGBT rights in Louisiana
 Same-sex marriage in the United States

Notes

References

2015 in LGBT history
2015 in Louisiana
LGBT in Louisiana
Louisiana